Nothing Left is an American supergroup that formed in 2016. The band played their first shows in Europe.

Background
Nothing Left formed in 2016, following the announced disbanding of the band For Today. The band opened for For Today on the European leg of the Farewell Tour. The band also consists of members of A Bullet for Pretty Boy, Silent Planet and Take It Back!. The band is now signed to Facedown Records and released their debut EP, Destroy and Rebuild, on April 21, 2017. The band released their debut album, Disconnected, on December 13, 2019.

Members
Current
 Danon Saylor – vocals (2016–present) (A Bullet for Pretty Boy)
 Ryan Leitru – guitar, vocals (2016–present) (For Today)
 Brandon Leitru – guitar, (2016–present) (For Today)
 Alex Camarena – drums (2016–present) (Silent Planet)
 Devin Henderson - bass (2017–present) (Take It Back!)

Live
 Cody Bradley - bass (2016–2017) (Take It Back!)

Discography
Studio albums
Disconnected (2019)

EPs
Destroy and Rebuild (2017)

Singles
 "Hands of Death" (2016; Nuclear Blast)

References

External links

Musical groups established in 2016
Nuclear Blast artists
Facedown Records artists
Christian metal musical groups
American hardcore punk groups
2016 establishments in the United States